The Randall Building at 103-105 W. Santa Rosa, Victoria, Texas was built in c.1910 by the Bailey Mills contracting firm.  It was listed on the National Register of Historic Places in 1986.

It is a commercial building with structural brick walls and with wood floor and roof systems.  Its roof is built-up tar and gravel.  It has a raised brick parapet and a denticulated brick cornice.  Its east portion is a one-story and the rest is two-story.  Its second story was used by the local Knights of Columbus as their meeting hall, and the first floor was for businesses.  The one-story portion of the building was the Victoria Hardware Company for many years, then auto supply stores.

It was listed on the NRHP as part of a study which listed numerous historic resources in the Victoria area.

See also

National Register of Historic Places listings in Victoria County, Texas

References

Commercial buildings on the National Register of Historic Places in Texas
Buildings and structures completed in 1910
Buildings and structures in Victoria, Texas
National Register of Historic Places in Victoria, Texas